Bolshaya Tes was a rural locality (a (village) in the Novosyolovsky District of Krasnoyarsk Krai, Russia.

Geography
Bolshaya Tes was named after the Bolshaya Tes River, currently known as Tes, which flowed into the Yenisey near the village. On the maps of the 19th-early 20th centuries, it was called Tesinskaya.

History
There was a village in the Novoselovskaya volost of the Minusinsky Uyezd in Yeniseysk Governorate. Bolshaya Tes was flooded during the filling of the Krasnoyarsk Reservoir in 1972.

Notable people
Bolshaya Tes was the birthplace of politician Konstantin Chernenko.

Konstantin Chernenko
Konstantin Chernenko (1911-1985) was a very influential member of the USSR’s Politburo who eventually succeeded Yuri Andropov as General Secretary of the Soviet Union ahead of his preferred successor, Mikhail Gorbachev. However, during his short reign for one year, he was in failing health and often mumbled his speech and had to use a special escalator in the Kremlin. During his tenure as leader, he boycotted the 1984 Summer Olympics, with the USSR citing “chauvinistic sentiments and an anti-Soviet hysteria being whipped up in the United States”. The Soviet Union was joined in this by many communist countries and set up the “Friendship Games” for these countries. Chernenko’s reasoning for boycotting the Olympics is commonly thought to be in revenge for the USA doing the same thing the time before.

References

Former populated places in Krasnoyarsk Krai
1972 disestablishments in the Soviet Union